"Ain't Nothing 'bout You" is a song written by Tom Shapiro and Rivers Rutherford and recorded by American country music duo Brooks & Dunn.  It was released on February 12, 2001 as the first single from Brooks & Dunn’s album Steers & Stripes.  The song was nominated by the Country Music Association for Single of the Year.  It spent six consecutive weeks as the  1 song on the US Country chart, and eventually ranked as the chart's  1 song of 2001. It also reached No. 25 on the Billboard Hot 100 chart and ranked No. 71 for the year on that chart.

In 2019, Brooks & Dunn re-recorded "Ain't Nothing 'bout You" with American country music artist Brett Young for their album Reboot.

Critical reception
Chuck Taylor, of Billboard magazine reviewed the song favorably calling it "a sultry, hook-laden tune that finds Ronnie Dunn in fine vocal form." He says that this single represents a departure from Brooks & Dunn's signature honky-tonk style.

Cover versions
Country/Pop music singer Taylor Swift covered the song from The Last Rodeo Tour

Music video
The music video was directed by Trey Fanjoy. It features a model, (a then unknown Alana De La Garza of Law & Order fame) who is the central character of the video. It was shot in an abandoned warehouse, and shot in green. It was also the only video by the duo to be directed by Fanjoy. Throughout the video, the model is seen in different layouts. The duo are performing, with a full band, on a high platform, in front of a screen, projecting the model's scenes. The model is also seen poking her head through thin blinds, seen as both the first, and last image of the video. The video was released in March 2001.

Chart positions
"Ain't Nothing 'bout You" debuted at  48 on the U.S. Billboard Hot Country Singles & Tracks chart for the week of February 17, 2001.

Year-end charts

References

2001 singles
2001 songs
Country ballads
2000s ballads
Brooks & Dunn songs
Brett Young (singer) songs
Songs written by Tom Shapiro
Songs written by Rivers Rutherford
Music videos directed by Trey Fanjoy
Billboard Hot Country Songs number-one singles of the year
Song recordings produced by Mark Wright (record producer)
Arista Nashville singles